Tomorrow.io (formerly ClimaCell; legally known as The Tomorrow Companies Inc.) is an American weather technology company. It provides real-time weather forecasting services and APIs.

History 

The company was founded in 2015 as ClimaCell to develop a real-time weather forecasting service based on cellular and IoT monitoring systems.

In February 2021, Tomorrow.io announced Operation Tomorrow Space. The company hoped to broaden its business model by launching proprietary radar satellites to improve its forecasting abilities. In March of that year, it announced that it had raised $77 million in a series D round of funding.

Technology
Tomorrow.io's primary goal was to use wireless communication infrastructure and IoT devices to collect real-time weather data. The company aimed to report conditions closer to the ground than satellite and higher resolution than Doppler weather radar techniques.

The information includes measurements on temperature, wind and precipitation data. After two years of development, Tomorrow.io's Weather Intelligence Platform (formerly Hypercast) was publicly launched in April 2017.

Expected to officially launch at the end of 2022, the company's Operation Tomorrow Space is aimed to launch radar satellites to improve their forecasting accuracy. The company claims that this will help close gaps in weather forecasting by vertically integrating the data processing chain.

Business model
The company's software is designed to provide information to aviation, construction, insurance, sports, and utility services. Clients include JetBlue Airways, Delta, and the New England Patriots.

Tomorrow.io launched a mobile weather app, ClimaCell Weather, in 2019. The app was later renamed to Weather by Tomorrow.

References

Meteorological companies
Companies based in Boston